Aliaksandr Vakhaviak (born 25 December 1987) is a Belarusian judoka.

He is the gold medallist of the 2013 Judo Grand Prix Almaty and is scheduled to participate for Belarus at the 2020 Summer Olympics.

References

External links
 
 

1987 births
Living people
Belarusian male judoka
Judoka at the 2019 European Games
20th-century Belarusian people
21st-century Belarusian people